The Tengawai River (also Te Ana a Wai) flows through south Canterbury, in New Zealand's South Island.

Rivers of Canterbury, New Zealand
Rivers of New Zealand